Undringar is the debut studio album from Swedish singer/songwriter Ted Gärdestad, released in 1972 on the Polar Music label. It contains his breakthrough single "Jag vill ha en egen måne" as well as "Hela världen runt", "När du kommer" and "Snurra du min värld". The album was produced by Benny Andersson and Björn Ulvaeus, engineered by Michael B. Tretow and features uncredited vocals by Agnetha Fältskog and Anni-Frid Lyngstad. In 1991 the album was released on CD.

Track listing
Music by Ted Gärdestad, lyrics by Kenneth Gärdestad except where noted.

Side A:
"Helena" (T. Gärdestad) – 3:19
"Sommarlängtan" – 2:37
"Jag vill ha en egen måne" – 3:17
"Räcker jag till" – 3:00
"Ett stilla regn" – 3:26
"När du kommer" – 2:47

Side B:
"Snurra du min värld" – 2:59
"Så mycket bättre" – 3:54
"Hela världen runt" – 2:41
"I dröm och fantasi" – 4:05
"Beat It, Girl" – 4:34

Personnel
 Ted Gärdestad – lead vocals, guitar
 Benny Andersson – piano, backing vocals
 Björn Ulvaeus – acoustic guitar, backing vocals
 Janne Schaffer – acoustic guitar, electric guitar
 Mike Watson – bass guitar
 Ola Brunkert – drums
 Agnetha Fältskog – backing vocals
 Anni-Frid Lyngstad – backing vocals
 Lena Andersson – backing vocals ("Helena")

Production 
 Benny Andersson – producer
 Björn Ulvaeus – producer
 Michael B. Tretow – sound engineer
 Rune Persson – sound engineer
 Åke Elmsäter – sound engineer
 Recorded at Metronome Studios, Stockholm
 Originally released as Polar POLS 234, 1972.

References 

 Liner notes Undringar, Ted Gärdestad, Polar Music POLS 234, 1972.

1972 debut albums
Ted Gärdestad albums
Swedish-language albums